Brachyceratops ('short horned face') is a dubious genus of ceratopsian dinosaur known only from partial juvenile specimens dating to the late Cretaceous Period of Montana, United States.

Brachyceratops has historically been known from juvenile remains, with one specimen having since been re-classified as Rubeosaurus ovatus.

History of discovery

Brachyceratops montanensis, the type species, was first discovered in the Two Medicine Formation (Campanian, about 74 million years old) on a Blackfoot Indian Reservation in Teton County in north-central Montana. The original find was made on August 1913 by C. W. Gilmore and his assistant John Floyd Strayer and was named and shortly described by Gilmore one year later. The specific name refers to the provenance from Montana. 

All that was found were incomplete and jumbled remains of five juvenile individuals of about 1.5 m (5 feet) in length. It has been speculated that these juveniles may have been nest mates that stayed together after hatching. The holotype specimen is USNM 7951, a partial skull. The paratypes are USNM 7952, a snout, USNM 7953, a partial skeleton with skull and USNM 7957, a foot. The material is disarticulated but the preservation is excellent. In 1917 Gilmore published a monograph on Brachyceratops in which a reconstruction of the skeleton as a whole was given.

In 1939 Gilmore referred a larger subadult specimen, USNM 14765, to Brachyceratops. All specimens are currently part of the collection of the Smithsonian Institution in Washington D.C., where a skeletal restoration is mounted.

As Brachyceratops is known only from the remains of five juveniles — plus the subadult that Gilmore found about a mile from the original specimens —, it was long considered likely that these represented the immature forms of known centrosaurine ceratopsians, with Monoclonius often suggested as the likeliest candidate. By 2011 however, several studies had shown that the single specimen which was adult enough to be compared with related species, USNM 14765, represented the juvenile form of the later-named Rubeosaurus.

Description

Among the five original specimens parts of three skulls were discovered, detached from their owner's body and fragmented. Despite this, the skull showed that the animal had only small bumps over the eyes rather than full-grown horns like in the more famous ceratopsians such as Triceratops. The nasal horn was thick and low, while its neck frill was moderately large. Unfortunately the specimens were incomplete so it cannot be determined if there were parietal openings in the frill like some other ceratopsians possessed.

Classification
 
Brachyceratops belonged to the Centrosaurinae, but its exact placement has been difficult to discover because it is known only from juvenile specimens. In 1997, Scott Sampson and colleagues re-examined Brachyceratops and noted that it is almost certainly the juvenile form of an already known centrosaurine dinosaur. However, because many features that distinguish ceratopsians from each other do not appear until adulthood, exactly which centrosaurine remained unknown, and Sampson et al. classified Brachyceratops as a nomen dubium, or dubious name. In 2007, Michael J. Ryan and colleagues suggested that Brachyceratops was possibly the juvenile form of Styracosaurus ovatus, which has since been reclassified as Rubeosaurus. A 2011 study supported this idea for the most mature specimen of Brachyceratops, USNM 14765, which shows one unique newly evolved feature (apomorphy) in common with Rubeosaurus to the exclusion of other centrosaurines. However, the same study suggested that because the holotype specimen of Brachyceratops is too incomplete and juvenile to preserve any determinable apomorphies, Brachyceratops must be considered a nomen dubium, and cannot be a senior synonym of Rubeosaurus.

See also
 Timeline of ceratopsian research

References

Centrosaurines
Late Cretaceous dinosaurs of North America
Nomina dubia
Fossil taxa described in 1914
Paleontology in Montana
Taxa named by Charles W. Gilmore
Campanian genus first appearances
Campanian genus extinctions
Ornithischian genera